Crossfire is an online tactical first-person shooter game developed by Smilegate Entertainment for Microsoft Windows. It was first released in South Korea on May 3, 2007.

Due to its popularity in Asia, especially China and South Korea, it has become one of the world's most-played video games by player count, with a lifetime total of  users in 80 countries worldwide. It was the world's top-grossing online game as of 2014, and went on to become one of the highest-grossing video games of all time, having grossed  in lifetime revenue .

The game has spawned a media franchise. A film adaptation of the game was announced in October 2015. A Chinese television drama series based on the game (named Cross Fire/穿越火线(网络剧) premiered in July 2020, starring Luhan and Leo Wu. It became a commercial success with more than  views in China .

Gameplay 

Crossfire is a free-to-play first-person shooter that features two mercenary corporations named the "Black List" and "Global Risk," fighting each other in an epic global conflict. Players assume the role of either a Black List or Global Risk mercenary, joining an online team that must work together to complete objective-based scenarios. Except for the Mutation and Wave modes, each mode can support a maximum of 16 players, each divided into an 8-man team.

Players progress and eventually be promoted through various military ranks, beginning at trainee, with the highest being Marshall. Players can also customize their character's equipment and appearance through in-game items.

Crossfire has a free currency which is called "Game Points" (GP), which is earned through playing and completing matches, buying premium items that grant bonus GP, or fulfilling certain missions.  Premium and special items like modified weapons can only be bought using monetary currencies. The content tends to vary from version to version.

Every modes 
Crossfire features several game modes, each with unique maps and rules.

 Team Deathmatch
 A standard mode where teams fight against each other to win. There are 2 ways to win, either reach the required kills, or have the highest kill before the time runs out.
 Search and Destroy
 Another standard mode where the attacking team (Black List) needs to plant a bomb on one of the two sites, while the defending team (Global Risk) needs to defend their sites from planting the bombs. Unlike TDM, there's no respawn and need to wait for the round to finish until another round before they respawn. Round wins if BL has planted the bomb and defend the site from defusing the bomb or they completely eliminate the defending team, and GR if they managed to defuse the bomb before it explodes, eliminate all of the enemies, or survive without planting the bomb. 
 Free for All
 Another standard mode, but unlike TDM and S&D, there are no teams (perhaps the name of the mode). Player need to kill other players, but quickly respawns after they die in a random location. A player wins via required kills or having the most kills within the limited time.
 Mutation Mode
 A mode where 2 teams battle against zombies, and vice versa. Soldiers can use any weapon they have, while zombies have special abilities at the cost of health reduction. Supplies drop in random spots for the survivors to pick up, ranging from pistols to grenades. Survivors win if they eliminate all zombies or survive from getting infected, and zombies win if they infect all soldiers. There are 4 types of mutation modes and 2 expansions currently in the game.
 Wave Mode
 5v5 or 4v4 team based mode. Both teams must destroy the opposition's defense towers in order to reach the base, which has two "Last defense towers" guarding it, and players must destroy those two towers to start damaging the base (clearance of all side towers is not needed). This is the first mode where the player can pick one of eleven classes before joining the room. Each class is different and has its own skills. This mode also introduces NPCs, airstrikes, mortar bombs, energy transmitters and Class Upgrade Systems.
 King Mode
 No teams. Players compete in a series of mini-games each round, and the players with the highest score gets selected as a commander each round. The game continues until a player reaches a certain score and fight to be crowned the King.
 Sheep Mode
 No teams. Players compete to get the most points in the end by picking up sheep, which generate points every so often. Once someone has gotten to a point limit set before the game, the golden sheep is spawned, and everyone must fight to see who will get it.
 Big Head
 Team death match but with a twist, as the player kills they level up, increasing their head size. The maximum is five. A bar will fill up for each team and when it is full, that team will enter "Big Head" mode, where the player is able to instant kill anyone with a melee attack.

Weapons
Crossfire weapons are based on real-life models, with each weapon belonging to a category.  Categories include machine guns, assault rifles and sniper rifles.  Each category is functionally similar to their real world counterparts (E.g. Machine guns are heavy, powerful, lay down heavy fire and have long reload times, Submachine guns are lighter and fire faster but deal less damage, Shotguns are effective in close range but ineffective at long distance.)  Weapons often have many variations, including different skins which give them different attributes.  In addition, the re-skinned versions are often rarer.  There are also some weapons which are different from other weapons like the VIP weapons, which have better functions like faster reload, among others.  Certain modes have mode-exclusive weapons.

Characters 

Characters are the avatar of players and are what they will look like while playing in the game. A note is that while all characters are visually unique from each other, they are all functionally the same with no real advantages or disadvantages from each other in terms of stats, apart from a few limited-edition characters who are, for example; able to see better through smoke or reduce the visual incapacitating effects of flash bang grenades.

The characters featured in Crossfire are a combination of both real and fictional Special Forces groups. The real groups featured are: The Russian OMON, the LAPD SWAT, the British SAS and SBS, the Brazilian BOPE, the German GSG 9, the Korean 707th Special Mission Group, the United Nations Special Forces, and the American Navy SEALs. Each character also has both a Black List and Global Risk variant. Some characters are bought with GP, while some are bought with premium currency. There are special characters found in some modes like the knight.

There are also mutant characters for the Mutation/Hero modes, which unlike regular game characters, each have unique abilities.

Regional availability

Commercial performance
Crossfire is the most played video game worldwide, with 6 million concurrent users and 1 billion registered players in February 2020, according to developer Smilegate, with the majority of players in Asia, especially China and South Korea. The game had 660million players worldwide by 2018.

In 2013, the game was one of the three most popular video games in China, with a revenue of almost $1 billion. By 2015, Crossfire had grossed , making it one of the top five highest-grossing video games of all time, along with Space Invaders, Pac-Man, Street Fighter II and World of Warcraft. In 2018, Crossfire grossed , making it one of the year's five top-grossing video games, along with Fortnite, DFO, League of Legends and Pokémon Go. It grossed  in 2019.

References

External links 
 

Crossfire (series)
2007 video games
Esports games
First-person shooters
Multiplayer video games
Video games about bomb disposal
Video games about police officers
Video games about the Special Air Service
Video games about the United States Navy SEALs
Video games developed in South Korea
Windows games
Windows-only games
Tactical shooter video games